This is a list of electoral results for the Western Province in Victorian state elections.

Members for Western Province

 Rodda resigned in July 1943, re-elected in October 1943

Election results

Elections in the 2000s

This election followed the vacancy caused by the resignation of Roger Hallam, who resigned. The by-election was conducted on the same day as the 2002 election, but used the old electoral boundaries.

Elections in the 1990s

Elections in the 1980s

Elections in the 1970s

 Preferences were not distributed.

Elections in the 1960s

 This by-election was caused by the death of Ronald Mack.

Elections in the 1950s

References

Victoria (Australia) state electoral results by district